is a railway station in the city of Nagaoka, Niigata, Japan, operated by East Japan Railway Company (JR East).

Lines
Teradomari Station is served by the Echigo Line and is 39.0 kilometers from the terminus of the line at Kashiwazaki Station.

Station layout
The station consists of a one ground-level side platform and one island platform serving three tracks, connected by a footbridge. The station is staffed.

Suica farecard cannot be used at this station.

Platforms

History
Teradomari Station opened on 20 April 1913. It reverted to its former name on 11 January 1986. With the privatization of Japanese National Railways (JNR) on 1 April 1987, the station came under the control of JR East.

Passenger statistics
In fiscal 2017, the station was used by an average of 177 passengers daily (boarding passengers only).

See also
 List of railway stations in Japan

References

Surrounding area
Sado Steamship Line Teradomari Ferry Terminal

External links

 JR East station information 

Railway stations in Nagaoka, Niigata
Railway stations in Japan opened in 1913
Echigo Line
Stations of East Japan Railway Company